Moyse's Hall is a building in the Suffolk town of Bury St Edmunds. It is a Grade I listed building and is thought to have been originally built circa 1180. Now a museum, it has been used for many purposes, including as the town's jail, police station, hostel, parcels office and as a workhouse.

History 
The early usage of Moyse's Hall is often said to have been as a synagogue or 'Jew's house' but this is a matter of contention. The origin of the name is unclear and a topic of debate, with its earliest known usage to be in 1328. Some suggesting that it was once owned by a Jew named after a corruption of Moses, although no records show a contemporary Jew with this name or similar in Bury St Edmunds. Others point to concurrent gentile families in the area bearing the name of Moys, Moises, Mose and Moyse. 

There is limited evidence to suggest that the building was in use as an inn and tavern from 1300 up to 1600. 

The building has undergone several restorations including one in 1858, funded in part by the town municipality, 36 years before the building came into the care of the town. A tower clock was installed in the 1860. A refurbishment extending the museum into run down buildings at the rear was carried out in 2000-2002.

Museum

On 31 May 1899 Lord John Hervey opened the building as Moyse's Hall Museum.

The museum is home to the Gershom-Parkington clock collection, and artefacts concerning the Red Barn Murder, as well as important finds such as an aestel found in Drinkstone. Works by artists such as Mary Beale, Sybil Andrews and Angelica Kauffman are also in the collection.

See also 
 Jew's House, Lincoln

References

External links

Moyse's Hall Museum

Bury St Edmunds
Grade I listed buildings in Suffolk
Museums in Suffolk
Buildings and structures completed in the 12th century
Norman architecture in England
Jews and Judaism in England